Kobeřice is a municipality and village in Opava District in the Moravian-Silesian Region of the Czech Republic. It has about 3,200 inhabitants. It is part of the historic Hlučín Region.

History

The first written mention of Kobeřice is in a forgery from 1236, which mentioned the year 1183.

Since 1742 the village belonged to Prussia after Maria Theresa had been defeated.

Sights
The landmark of Kobeřice is the Church of the Assumption of the Virgin Mary. it was built in the neo-Gothic style in 1896 and replaced an old wooden church from 1711.

References

External links

Villages in Opava District
Hlučín Region